Chromosome 5 open reading frame 22 (c5orf22) is a protein-coding gene of poorly characterized function in Homo sapiens. The primary alias is unknown protein family 0489 (UPF0489).

Gene 
C5orf22 is located on the positive strand of Chromosome 5 at 5P13.3, spanning 22,779 nucleotides, from base pair 31532275 to 31555053. C5orf22 encodes 9 total exons and contains 7 isoforms. Isoform variants differ in their exon configuration and untranslated region. Transcript variant 1 is the canonical isoform, encoding 442 amino acids across 9 exons.

Expression and regulation 
C5orf22 displays ubiquitous RNA expression across tissue types from all 3 germ layers and from all phases of development in humans, mice, chickens, and zebrafish. There are statistically significant differences in RNA expression between select tissues, with skeletal muscle containing the greatest abundance (7.8 RPKM)

C5orf22 contains 1 predicted promoter directly upstream of the gene (GXP_55076). This promoter is 1,081 base pairs and partially overlaps with the 5’ untranslated region. GXP_55076 is assigned to all transcript variants. Transcription factor binding elements consist of TATA box binding elements, SMAD transcription factors, MAF/AP1 binding factors, and several others.

Neighboring elements 
C5orf22 closest neighboring element is Drosha, a ribonuclease which is encoded by the minus strand proximal to C5orf22. Drosha is a double stranded endoribonuclease that assists with the first step of microRNA biogenesis.

Structure 

C5orf22 contains 2 globular domains and 3 small disordered regions. The molecular-weight is approximately 50 kDa. The isoelectric point is 4.7. C5orf22 contains relatively average amino acid proportions compared to most proteins. There were no significant outliers in abundance of individual amino acids. C5orf22 contains several predicted post-translational modifications including phosphorylation sites, ubiquitination sites, glycosylation sites, SH2 domain, and a myristylation site.

Subcellular distribution 
C5orf22 is most likely to exist as a soluble protein located within the cytoplasm and nucleus.  Amino acid sequence predictions and immunhistochemical staining support the bilocalization of C5orf22 to cytoplasm and nucleus. Furthermore, amino acid sequence analysis indicated a predicted partial nuclear localization signal (NLS) from AA 175-185.

Function 
The precise function of C5orf22 is still unknown however it is hypothesized to be a component of a DNA splicing complex. Proteomic research implicated the protein product as a novel component of the WBP11/PQBP1 splicing complex which regulates expression of genes involved in a spectrum of processes ranging from DNA repair to immunomodulation. C5orf22 knockdown was associated with downregulation of alternative splicing events that led to aberrant gene expression of select genes and ultimately cell cycle dysfunction. Cell localization evidence and the presence of a NLS further support this hypothesized function.

Interacting proteins 
Experimental evidence has indicated over 20 interactors with C5orf22.  Interactants are localized to both the nucleus and cytoplasm. The most likely interactors are WBP11, OSM, Surf2, ELOF1, and DDITL4.

Evolution & homology 
C5orf22 initially appeared in invertebrates approximately 797 million years ago. It is the only member of its gene family. Human UPF0489 C5orf22 is conserved through invertebrates. C5orf22 orthologs showed conservation of the two globular domains through bony fish and conservation of 1 globular domain within arthropods. Isoelectric point and molecular weights of C5orf22 orthologs were within ∓ 0.15 and ∓ 3kDa through bony fish. There are no paralogs to c5orf22 in humans.

UPF0489 C5orf22 is slow evolving protein, based on comparisons of the percent corrected divergence of orthologous proteins.

Clinical significance 
Recent studies on miRNA’s role in breast cancer pathogenesis has correlated upregulation of C5orf22 with reduced survival of breast cancer patients.

Patient's with tibial muscular dystrophy, exhibit decreased expression of C5orf22.  Patient's with non-ischemic cardiomyopathy exhibit increased expression of C5orf22.

References